Millard's rat (Dacnomys millardi) is a species of rodent in the family Muridae.  It is the only species in the genus Dacnomys.
It is found in China, India, Laos, and Nepal.

References

Rats of Asia
Old World rats and mice
Rodents of India
Mammals of Nepal
Mammals described in 1916
Taxa named by Oldfield Thomas
Taxonomy articles created by Polbot